Cychrus minshanicola is a species of ground beetle in the subfamily of Carabinae. It was described by Deuve in 1987.

References

minshanicola
Beetles described in 1987